Stirling is a city in central Scotland,  northeast of Glasgow and  north-west of Edinburgh. The market town, surrounded by rich farmland, grew up connecting the royal citadel, the medieval old town with its merchants and tradesmen, the Old Bridge and the port. Located on the River Forth, Stirling is the administrative centre for the Stirling council area, and is traditionally the county town of Stirlingshire. Proverbially it is the strategically important "Gateway to the Highlands".

It has been said that "Stirling, like a huge brooch clasps Highlands and Lowlands together". Similarly "he who holds Stirling, holds Scotland" is sometimes attributed to Robert the Bruce.
Stirling's key position as the lowest bridging point of the River Forth before it broadens towards the Firth of Forth made it a focal point for travel north or south.

When Stirling was temporarily under Anglo-Saxon sway, according to a 9th-century legend, it was attacked by Danish invaders. The sound of a wolf roused a sentry, however, who alerted his garrison, which forced a Viking retreat. This led to the wolf being adopted as a symbol of the town as is shown on the 1511 Stirling Jug. The area is today known as Wolfcraig. Even today the wolf appears with a goshawk on the council's coat of arms along with the recently chosen motto: "Steadfast as the Rock".

Once the capital of Scotland, Stirling is visually dominated by Stirling Castle. Stirling also has a medieval parish church, the Church of the Holy Rude, where, on 29 July 1567, the infant James VI was anointed King of Scots by Adam Bothwell, the Bishop of Orkney, with the service concluding after a sermon by John Knox. The poet King was educated by George Buchanan and grew up in Stirling. He was later also crowned King of England and Ireland on 25 July 1603, bringing closer the countries of the United Kingdom. Modern Stirling is a centre for local government, higher education, tourism, retail, and industry. The mid-2012 census estimate for the population of the city is 36,440; the wider Stirling council area has a population of about 93,750.

One of the principal royal strongholds of the Kingdom of Scotland, Stirling was created a royal burgh by King David I in 1130. In 2002, as part of Queen Elizabeth's Golden Jubilee, Stirling was granted city status.

History

Etymology 
The origin of the name Stirling is uncertain, but folk etymology suggests that it originates in either a Scots or Gaelic term meaning the place of battle, struggle or strife. One proposal is that Stirling derives from Gaelic srib-linn, meaning "stream-pool" or similar. Other sources suggest that it originates in a Brythonic name meaning "dwelling place of Melyn", with the first element being connected to Middle Welsh ystre-, "a dwelling". The name may have originally been a hydronym, and connected to Brittonic *lïnn, "lake, pool" (Welsh llyn).
It is often argued that Stirling is the fortress of Iuddeu or Urbs Giudi where Oswiu of Northumbria was besieged by Penda of Mercia in 655, as recorded in Bede and contemporary annals.

Ancient history
A stone cist, found in Coneypark Nursery in 1879, is Stirling's oldest catalogued artefact. Bones from the cist were radiocarbon dated and found to be over four millennia old, originating within the date range 2152 to 2021 BC. Nicknamed Torbrex Tam, the man, whose bones were discovered by workmen, died while still in his twenties. Other Bronze Age finds near the city come from the area around Cambusbarron. 
It had been thought that the Randolphfield standing stones were more than 3000 years old but recent radiocarbon dating suggests they may date from the time of Bruce. 
The earliest known structures in Stirling are now destroyed but comprised two Neolithic Cursus in Bannockburn. The earliest known surviving structure is a fort on Gillies Hill were built by Iron Age people over 2000 years ago. Two structures are known: what is currently called Wallstale Dun on the southern end of Touchadam Craig, and Gillies Hill fort on the northwest end of the craig. The Wallstale structure is later than the Gillies Hill fort and is related in form to brochs, these appear to coincide with the Roman period and there are around 40 or so in the wider area.  South of the city, the King's Park prehistoric carvings can still be found.

Roman and early Medieval
Its other notable geographic feature is its proximity to the lowest site of subjugation of the River Forth. Control of the bridge brought military advantage in times of unrest and excise duty, or pontage dues, in peacetime. Unsurprisingly excise men were installed in a covered booth in the centre of the bridge to collect tax from any entering the royal burgh with goods. Stirling remained the river's lowest reliable crossing point (that is, without a weather-dependent ferry or seasonal ford) until the construction of the Alloa Swing Bridge between Throsk and Alloa in 1885.

The city has two Latin mottoes, which appeared on the earliest burgh seal of which an impression of 1296 is on record. The first alludes to the story as recorded by Boece who relates that in 855 Scotland was invaded by two Northumbrian princes, Osbrecht and Ella. They united their forces with the Cumbrian Britons in order to defeat the Scots.  Having secured Stirling castle, they built the first stone bridge over the Forth.

On the top they reportedly raised a crucifix with the inscription: "Anglos, a Scotis separat, crux ista remotis; Arma hic stant Bruti; stant Scoti hac sub cruce tuti." Bellenden translated this loosely as "I am free marche, as passengers may ken, To Scottis, to Britonis, and to Inglismen." It may be the stone cross was a tripoint for the three kingdom's borders or marches; the cross functioning both as a dividing territorial marker, and as a uniting witness stone like in the Bible story in Joshua 22. "Angles and Scots here demarked, By this cross kept apart. Brits and Scots armed stand near, By this cross stand safe here." This would make the cross on the centre of the first stone bridge the Heart of Scotland.

The Stirling seal has only the second part, in a slightly different form:

Hic Armis Bruti Scoti Stant Hic Cruce Tuti 
(Brits and Scots armed and near, by this cross stand safe here.)

Apparently the Latin is not first rate having four syllables in "cruce tuti" but the meaning seems to be that the Lowland Strathclyde Britons on the southern shore and the Highland Pictish Scots on the northern shore stand protected from each other by their common Christianity.

A more modern translation suggests that rather than Briton, bruit might be better read as brute, ie brute Scots, implying a non-Scots identity was retained in Stirling for some time after inclusion into the land controlled by the King of Scots.

The second motto is:
Continet Hoc in Se Nemus et Castrum Strivelinse 
(Contained within this seal pressed down, the wood an' castle o' Stirlin' town.)

It has been claimed that the "Bridge" seal was regarded as the Burgh seal proper, the "Castle" seal being simply a reverse, used when the seal was affixed by a lace to a charter. This agrees with a description in an official publication (which spells Bruti with only one letter t). Clearer images are available with different lettering. Sibbald conflated the two mottos into a single rhyme; he gave no indication that he was aware of Boece's work.

Stirling was first declared a royal burgh by King David in the 12th century, with later charters reaffirmed by subsequent monarchs. A ferry, and later bridge, on the River Forth at Stirling brought wealth and strategic influence, as did its tidal port at Riverside. Major battles during the Wars of Scottish Independence took place at the Stirling Bridge in 1297 and at the nearby village of Bannockburn in 1314 involving Andrew Moray and William Wallace, and Robert the Bruce respectively. After the Battle of Stirling Bridge, Moray and Wallace wrote to the Hanseatic leaders of Lübeck and Hamburg to encourage trade between Scottish ports (like Stirling) and these German cities. There were also several Sieges of Stirling Castle in the conflict, notably in 1304.

Late Medieval and early Modern

Another important historical site in the area is the ruins of Cambuskenneth Abbey, the resting place of King James III of Scotland and his queen, Margaret of Denmark. The king died at the Battle of Sauchieburn by forces nominally led by his son and successor James IV. During the Wars of the Three Kingdoms, the Battle of Stirling also took place in the centre of Stirling on 12 September 1648. The fortifications continued to play a strategic military role during the 18th-century Jacobite risings. In 1715, the Earl of Mar failed to take control of the castle. In January 1746, the army of Bonnie Prince Charlie seized control of the town but failed to take the Castle. On their consequent retreat northwards, they blew up the church of St. Ninians where they had been storing munitions; only the tower survived and can be seen to this day. The castle and the church are shown on Blaeu's map of 1654 which was derived from Pont's earlier map.

Standing near the castle, the Church of the Holy Rude is one of the town's most historically important buildings. Founded in 1129 it is the second oldest building in the city after Stirling castle. It was rebuilt in the 15th-century after Stirling suffered a catastrophic fire in 1405, and is reputed to be the only surviving church in the United Kingdom apart from Westminster Abbey to have held a coronation. On 29 July 1567 the infant son of Mary, Queen of Scots, was anointed James VI of Scotland in the church. James' bride, Anne of Denmark was crowned in the church at Holyrood Palace in Edinburgh. The Holy Rude congregation still meet and some 19th century parish records survive. Musket shot marks that may come from Cromwell's troops during the Wars of the Three Kingdoms are clearly visible on the tower and apse of the church.

Economically, the city's port supported foreign trade, historically doing significant trade in the Low Countries, particularly with Bruges in Belgium and Veere in the Netherlands. In the 16th century there were so many Scots in Danzig in Prussia that they had their own church congregation and trade is mentioned with that city in Stirling Council's minutes of 1560. Around John Cowane's time there is an account which states there were about 30,000 Scots families living in Poland although that was possibly an exaggeration. Trade with the Baltic also took place such as a timber trade with Norway.

After the Jacobite threat had faded but before the railways were established, the Highland cattle drovers would use the Auld Brig on their way to market at Falkirk or Stenhousemuir. Three times a year, tens of thousands of cattle, sheep and ponies were moved together to the trysts in the south with some drovers going as far as Carlisle or even London's Smithfield. There is a record of a four-mile long tailback (of livestock) developing from St. Ninians to Bridge of Allan after a St. Ninians tollman had a dispute.

Victorian and Modern

In the early 19th century an "exceedingly low" cost steamboat service used to run between Stirling and Newhaven or Granton. The coming of the railways in 1848 started the decline of the river traffic, not least because the Alloa Swing Bridge downstream restricted access for shipping. The railways did provide opportunity too with one Riverside company selling their reaping machines as far afield as Syria and Australia. Similarly, in 1861, a company making baby carriages was set up. These prams were exported to Canada, South America, India and South Africa.

The Princes Street drill hall was completed in 1908 and the Municipal Buildings, which formed the headquarters of Stirling Burgh Council for much of the 20th century, were completed in 1918.

After the blockades of the World Wars there was some increase in the use of the port including a tea trade with India. However, with normal shipping lanes open, the growth of the railways including The Forth Rail Bridge, left the harbour uneconomical and by the mid 20th century the port had ceased to operate.

Governance

In terms of local government, the city of Stirling is a part of the wider Stirling Council area, which is based at Old Viewforth and governs on matters of local administration as set out by the Local Government etc (Scotland) Act 1994. The current members of the Council were voted in 2017 for a term of office of 5 years. The May 2017 local government election resulted in the Scottish Conservative party and Scottish National Party each winning nine councillors, while the Labour Party won four seats and the Scottish Green Party won one. However, subsequently one Conservative councillor left the party to sit as an Independent. The Provost of Stirling is Cllr Christine Simpson.

For the purposes of the Scottish Parliament, the city of Stirling forms part of the Stirling constituency of the Scottish Parliament constituency. The Stirling Scottish Parliament (or Holyrood) constituency created in 1999 is one of nine within the Mid Scotland and Fife electoral region. Each constituency elects one Member of the Scottish Parliament (MSP) by the first past the post system of election, and the region elects seven additional members to produce a form of proportional representation. The constituency's Member of the Scottish Parliament (MSP) is Evelyn Tweed of the Scottish National Party (SNP).

In terms of national government, the city of Stirling forms part of county constituency of Stirling constituency of the House of Commons, electing one Member of Parliament (MP) to the House of Commons of the parliament of the United Kingdom by first past the post system. Alyn Smith of the SNP is the MP for Stirling constituency of the House of Commons since the 2019 general election.

Historical voting records can be found in online databases.

Geography

Stirling is renowned as the Gateway to the Highlands and is generally regarded as occupying a strategic position at the point where the flatter, largely undulating Scottish Lowlands meet the rugged slopes of the Highlands along the Highland Boundary Fault. The starkness of this contrast is evidenced by the many hills and mountains of the lower Highlands such as Ben Vorlich and Ben Ledi which can be seen to the northwest of the city. On the other hand, the Carse of Stirling, stretching to the west and east of the city, is one of the flattest and most agriculturally productive expanses of land in the whole of Scotland.

The land surrounding Stirling has been most affected by glacial erosion and deposition. The city itself has grown up around its castle which stands atop an ancient quartz-dolerite sill, known as the Stirling Sill, a major defensive position which was at the lowest crossing point on the River Forth. Stirling stands on the Forth at the point where the river widens and becomes tidal. To the east of the city the Ochil Hills dominate the skyline with the highest peak in the range being Ben Cleuch, although Dumyat is more noticeable from Stirling. The Ochils meet the flat carse (floodplain) of the River Forth to the east of the distinctive geographical feature of Abbey Craig, a crag and tail hill upon which stands the 220 ft (67 m) high National Wallace Monument.

Areas of Stirling
Top of the Town consists of Broad Street, Castle Wynd, Ballengeich Pass, Lower Castle Hill Road, Darnley Street, Baker Street ( formerly Baxters St), St John Street and St Mary's Wynd. These streets all lead up to Stirling Castle and are the favourite haunt of tourists who stop off at the Old Town Jail, Mar's Wark, Argyll's Lodging and the castle.  Ballengeich Pass leads to the graveyard at Ballengeich and the Castle Wynd winds past the old graveyard. The Top of the Town from Broad Street upwards is renowned for its cobblestoned roads, and cars can be heard rattling over the cobblestones on the way down. Craft shops and tourist-focused shops are evident on the way up and once at the top, panoramic views are available across Stirling and beyond.

All areas

 Abbey Craig
 Airthrey
 Allan Park
 Back o' Hill
 Bannockburn
 Borestone
 Braehead
 Bridgehaugh
 Broomridge
 Brucefields
 Burghmuir
 Cambusbarron
 Cambuskenneth
 Causewayhead
 Chartershall
 Corn Exchange
 Cornton
 Coxethill
 Craigforth
 Craigmill
 Craig Leith
 Cultenhove
 Dumyat
 Forthbank
 Gillies Hill
 Gowan Hill
 Hillpark
 Kenningknowes
 Kersemill
 Kildean
 King's Park
 Ladyneuk
 Laurelhill
 Livilands
 Loanhead
 Logie
 Mote Hill
 Meadowforth
 Mercat Cross
 Pirnhall
 Queenshaugh
 Raploch
 Randolphfield
 Riverside
 Spittal Hill
 Springkerse
 St. Ninians
 Top of the Town
 Torbrex
 Whins of Milton
 Viewforth
 Westhaugh
 Wolfcraig

Historical place names for Stirling town in 1858–61 were compiled by O.S. map makers.

Climate
Like most of the United Kingdom, Stirling has an oceanic climate (Köppen Cfb) with mild summers and cool, wet winters. Stirling has some of the warmest summers in all of Scotland, being relatively far away from the cooling effects of the North Sea and the Firth of Clyde.

Demography
The settlement of Stirling had a population of 48,440 in 2012. According to the 2001 census, 52.7% of the population was female compared to 47.2% male. Stirling had both a smaller proportion of under 16s, at 16.7% compared to the Scottish average of 19.2%, and a smaller proportion of those of pensionable age: 17.8% – compared to the Scottish average of 18.6%.

Historical records also exist both in book form and in online databases.

Culture

Walking the Marches is a custom probably started in the 12th century. The only way the town's boundaries could be protected was to walk round inspecting them annually. The walk was followed by a dinner. This was traditionally done by the Birlaw men made up from members of the Seven Trades, the Guildry and Council. In 2014 the tradition was revived after an official abeyance of several years.

There are about sixteen libraries and two mobile libraries in Stirling. The Smith Art Gallery and Museum is now free to tourists and residents alike. Shearer's 1895 Penny Guide to Stirling and Neighbourhood used to list it under "How to spend a few hours on a wet day".
The Macrobert Arts Centre has a variety of exhibitions and performances. There are many events at the Stirling Tolbooth and at The Albert Halls.
Stirling has hosted the National Mòd several times: in 1909, 1961, 1971,1987 and 2008.

Religion

There are currently about 20 churches in the city.
These include:

Church of Scotland

Allan Park South Church
Cambusbarron Parish Church
Church of the Holy Rude
North Parish Church
St Columba's Church
St Mark's Parish Church
St Ninians Old Parish Church
Viewfield Church

Roman Catholic

 Holy Spirit, St. Ninians
 Our Lady and St Ninian's, Bannockburn
St Margaret of Scotland and Holy Spirit, Raploch
 St Mary's Church, Top of the Town

Other churches
 Cornerstone Community Church
Cornton Baptist Church
Holy Trinity Episcopal Church
 St Ninians United Free Church of Scotland
Stirling Baptist Church
Stirling Free Church
Stirling Methodist Church
St. Ninian's Community Church
The Salvation Army

Islam
 Central Scotland Islamic Centre

Economy
 
With Stirling's development as a market town and its location as the focus of transport and communications in the region, it has developed a substantial retail sector serving a wide range of surrounding communities as well as the city itself. Primarily centred on the city centre, there are a large number of chain stores, as well as the Thistles shopping centre. However this has been augmented by out-of-town developments such as the Springkerse Retail Park on the city bypass to the east of Stirling.

A major new regeneration project on the site of the former port area and the  former Ministry of Defence site, adjacent to Stirling Railway Station, is currently underway. Known as Forthside, it has the aim of developing a new waterfront district linked to the railway station via Forthside Bridge. The development comprises retail, residential and commercial elements, including a conference centre, hotel and Vue multiplex cinema, that will ultimately expand the city centre area, linking it to the River Forth, which has been cut off from the city centre area since the construction of the A9 bypass under the railway station in the 1960s.

In the service sector, financial services as well as tourism are the biggest employers. The financial services and insurance company Prudential established a large and base at Craigforth on the outskirts of Stirling in the 1970s.

In terms of tourism, the presence of such historical monuments as Stirling Castle and the Wallace Monument and other nearby attractions like Blair Drummond Safari Park has bolstered Stirling's position as a significant tourist destination in Scotland.

The University of Stirling and Stirling Council are two of the biggest employers in the area. Knowledge related industries, research and development as well as life sciences have clustered around the university in the Stirling University Innovation Park, close to its main campus.

Mauchline ware started producing wooden snuff-boxes in 1790 in Mauchline, Ayrshire. They were produced of the wood from the trees from the Castle craig. Today they are highly collectible.

Stirling is home to national construction companies Ogilvie Group, chaired by Duncan Ogilvie, who was listed in the Sunday Times Rich List as being worth £32 million in 2009.

A Bank of Scotland survey in 2009 found that workers in Stirling had the highest average earnings of £716 a week.

Transport

The City of Stirling is home to a large number of commuters but has fewer commuting to work in other areas, than travel into the city. About half of Scotland's population live within an hour's travel time of Stirling.

Local bus services to districts within the city are almost completely provided by buses operated by McGill's Scotland East. The surrounding towns, like Bridge of Allan, Alloa, Falkirk and Glasgow via Cumbernauld have services from the bus station.

Coaches to many Scottish towns and cities also run regularly.

There are also railway links from Stirling railway station, including inter-city rail services to Aberdeen, Dundee, Edinburgh Waverley, Inverness, Glasgow Queen Street, and London King's Cross. Services to Alloa, Bridge of Allan, Falkirk and Dunblane also run. Stirling Council provides some approximate journey times. Working lines include the Highland Main Line, the Edinburgh–Dunblane line and the Croy Line. The station formerly provided direct railway services to Callander and Oban, and to Loch Lomond, over very scenic lines, and a fast service to Dunfermline.

Cities with motorways links close to Stirling include Glasgow, via the M80 motorway past Cumbernauld, and Edinburgh, via the M9 motorway past Falkirk. To the north, the M9 provides access to Dunblane with easy links to Perth and further beyond the Central Belt.

Stirling has no airport, but there are international airports at Glasgow and Edinburgh which can be reached within an hour. Light aircraft can be chartered at Cumbernauld Airport.

Stirling used to have steamboats which carried hundreds of passengers a day. There is currently no working port at Stirling but there are plans to develop the river and the harbour which might include links with towns on the Firth of Forth. Since the Forth is tidal at Stirling, development of pontoon style landing stages could potentially allow river taxis and tourist boats to operate during the summer.

Sports and recreation

Stirling is home to professional league teams in football, rugby and cricket.

Marathon
The first Stirling Scottish Marathon was held on 21 May 2017.

Curling
The National Curling Academy is located in Stirling Sports Village. It was opened in 2017 by Eve Muirhead. They use facilities linked to The Peak. It was hoped this would increase the chances of British medals at events like the Winter Olympics and Paralympics.

Football

Men
The senior football team, Stirling Albion, play in the Scottish League Two at their home ground at Forthbank Stadium. In July 2010, the Stirling Albion Supporters' Trust successfully took over the running of the club buying out the long-serving chairman, Peter McKenzie, after 14 months of campaigning. This made Stirling Albion the first fully owned community club in the history of British football, after previous attempts made by Manchester United, Liverpool and Rangers.

Women
Stirling University L.F.C. are the premier women's football team. They play in the Scottish Women's Premier League. Their home ground is The Gannochy Sports Centre at Stirling University.

Rugby
Stirling County currently play in rugby's Scottish Premiership Division One.

Basketball
Stirling Knights Basketball Team are based at the Peak at Forthbank beside Forthbank Stadium.

Athletics
The athletics team Central Athletic Club are based at the University of Stirling.

Hockey
The University Stirling Wanderers Hockey Club have also moved to a brand new (international standard) pitch at Forthbank for season 2008–09.

Cricket
Next to this pitch there is also the ground of Stirling County Cricket Club, whose pavilion captured an architectural award in June 2009, three years after its opening.

Scotland international footballers Billy Bremner, John Colquhoun, Duncan Ferguson, female footballer Frankie Brown and brothers Gary and Steven Caldwell were born in Stirling. So were rugby internationals Kenny Logan, Allister Hogg and Alison McGrandles, jockey Willie Carson, and cricketer Dougie Brown.

The University of Stirling is a major centre of sports training and education in Scotland. It was designated as Scotland's University for Sporting Excellence by the Scottish Government in 2008. The headquarters of the Scottish Institute of Sport is a purpose-built facility on the campus which opened in 2002. Also at the university is the Scottish National Swimming Academy, where Rio 2016, Olympic silver medalists and students at the university, Duncan Scott and Robbie Renwick trained. Commonwealth gold medalist Ross Murdoch, who also competed at Rio 2106, is a student at the university. The Gannochy National Tennis centre, which is seen as a tennis centre of excellence, was where Andy Murray and his brother Jamie Murray honed their skills as juniors.  Gordon Reid, wheel chair Olympic gold medalist in 2016, was a tennis scholar at the university. The university men's and women's golf teams are consistently ranked among the best in Europe.

The university has a dedicated sports studies department, which is within the Faculty of Health Science and Sport, and is ranked amongst the best in the United Kingdom for its provision of sports facilities, with the maximum 5-star award, shared by 16 other universities in the UK. The University of Stirling also currently hosts the Scottish men's lacrosse champions.

Stirling and its surrounding area has a number of 9- and 18-hole golf courses, the largest of which is the Stirling Golf Course, located in the Kings Park area of the city. The Peak, a new Sports Village, was opened in April 2009 to cater for a range of sporting activities.

In June 2014, Stirling will become the home of Scottish cricket after an agreement between Stirling County Cricket Club, Cricket Scotland and Stirling Council. It is hoped that the redevelopment of the ground will start at end 2014 with the intention being to upgrade it to international match standards. Scotland will play the majority of their home international games at the ground, starting with the World T20 qualifiers in the summer of 2015.

The development will see a new pavilion and indoor training facility built at New Williamfield, the home of Stirling County Cricket Club, with Cricket Scotland relocating its headquarters from the National Cricket Academy at Ravelston, Edinburgh.

Education

The University of Stirling opened in 1967 on a greenfield site outside the town. Currently there are 11,100 students studying at the university, of which 7,995 are undergraduates and 3,105 are postgraduates. There are 120 nationalities represented on the university campus, with 19% of students coming from overseas. It has grown into a major research centre, with a large Innovation Park located immediately adjacent to the main university campus. Innovation Park has grown since its initiation in 1993, and is now home to 40 companies engaging in various forms of research and development. In January 2008 it was announced that students from Singapore would be able to gain degrees in retail from the University of Stirling in a tie-up with the country's Nanyang Polytechnic (NYP).

Stirling is also home to part of the wider Forth Valley College which was formed on 1 August 2005 from the merger of Falkirk, Stirling and Clackmannan colleges.

There are four main high schools in Stirling itself – Stirling High School, with a school roll of 964 pupils, Wallace High School with 958 pupils, St Modan's High School with 912 pupils, and Bannockburn High School in Broomridge with 752 pupils. All the city's secondary school premises have been redeveloped as a result of a Public-private partnership scheme. Stirling also has a Gaelic-medium unit situated in the city's Riverside Primary School which teaches pupils from across Stirling and Clackmannanshire through the medium of Scottish Gaelic.

In popular culture
 Stirling: Gateway to the Highlands (1938) B&W 20 mins silent – video 1: Street scenes from Stirling. video 2: pre-WW2 soldiers at the castle.
 Stirling Charities Day (13 May 1939) B&W 7 mins silent – Includes shots of kids, costumes and carriages.
 Neighbours – (1952) violent Oscar winning animation by the Stirling-born Canadian film maker Norman McLaren. 
 River Forth (1956) B&W silent 15 mins – Including animals being herded through the streets.
 The Heart of Scotland (1962) colour sound 24 mins – Shots of the castle with commentary on Bruce and Wallace.
 Holiday Scotland (1966) colour and sound 42 mins – Includes Stirling Castle and Stirling Bridge.
Kidnapped (1971) dir. Delbert Mann – Starring Michael Caine – with several scenes in Stirling Castle.
 Royal Stirling (1972) colour and sound 23 mins – Includes a lion cub at the castle, motor racing and shots of Blair Drummond Safari Park
The University of Stirling (1973) colour and sound 19 min – 1970s campus, students and teachers (includes Norman MacCaig).
 FutureWorld Stirling 1984 (1984) 28 minutes – dir. Peter G. Reilly for Stirling District Council – has Magnus Magnusson explaining ambitious plans for the Top of the Town. It is more of a series of pieces to camera than Cumbernauld, Town for Tomorrow, as Magnusson moves from the Smith through various well-known but dilapidated buildings to Gowan Hill and back to the castle. At each stop he presents John W. Morgan's script which gives something of the history or the proposed plans for revitalising the area.   
Gregory's Two Girls (1999) dir. Bill Forsyth – has scenes at and around Stirling Castle.
To End all Wars (2001) dir. David L. Cunningham has scenes at Stirling Castle.
Way Back Home (2010) Has Danny MacAskill perform stunts on his bike on Stirling Bridge.
KJB: The Book That Changed the World (2011) Has John Rhys-Davies narrating scenes about James VI at Stirling Castle.
Britain's Lost Routes with Griff Rhys Jones (2012) Episode 3 shows the difficulties "Highland Cattle Drovers" might have had at Frew and shows aerial shots and taking cows across the Auld Brig.
Secrets of Great British Castles (2015) Dan Jones presents the History of Stirling Castle up to James VI.
Netflix drama Outlaw King had scenes filmed at Mugdock Country Park with a production/support team camped at Falleninch Field, situated beneath Stirling Castle.

Twinned cities

 Villeneuve d'Ascq, France
 Dunedin, Florida, United States
 Óbuda, Hungary
 Summerside, Prince Edward Island, Canada
 Kecioren, Turkey

Notable residents 
 Dorothy Angus – embroidery artist
 Frank and Harold Barnwell – pilots and aircraft designers
 Frank Beattie – footballer
 Alexander Beith - Moderator of the General Assembly of the Free Church of Scotland
 Billy Bremner – former Leeds and Internationalist footballer
 Sir Henry Campbell-Bannerman – former Prime Minister
 Gary Caldwell – Former Scotland International footballer and manager. 
 Steven Caldwell – footballer
 Willie Carson – jockey
 Duncan Ferguson – footballer
 Robert Garnock – Covenanter, hanged in Edinburgh
 John Grierson – documentary film pioneer
 James Guthrie – minister and Protester
 Michael Hay – lawyer
 Thomas Hamilton, mass murderer responsible for the Dunblane massacre
 Gail Honeyman – novelist
 King James VI of Scotland – former resident
 Stephen Kingsley – footballer
 John Joseph Jolly Kyle – pioneer chemist
 Christian Maclagan – Sunday School teacher, antiquarian, early archaeologist, and suffragist
Bill Macnaught - National Librarian of New Zealand, 2011–2020
 Mary, Queen of Scots – former resident
 Mirren Mack – actress
 Muir Mathieson – film music composer
 Lauren Mayberry – musician
 John McAleese – team leader during the SAS assault on the Iranian embassy in May 1980
 Norman McLaren – animation pioneer
 Neil Oliver – television presenter
 John Paton – Victoria Cross recipient
Patrick Simson – minister respected by James VI
 Anna Sloan – Olympic curler, bronze medalists at the 2014 Winter Olympics
 Kirsty Young – television presenter

Freedom of the City
The following people and military units have received the Freedom of the City of Stirling.

Individuals
 HRH Duke of York: 29 August 1928.
 HRH Duchess of York: 29 August 1928.
 HRH Duchess of Edinburgh: 1948.
 Lieutenant Colonel Francis William Saunders : 17 July 2008.
 Irvin Iffla: 3 April 2009.
 Sir Andrew Murray : 22 April 2014.

Military Units
 The Argyll and Sutherland Highlanders: 1947.
 43 Squadron RAF: 2005.
 The Royal Regiment of Scotland: 10 March 2012.

See also
Black Bond
Lecropt
List of places in Stirling (district)
List of places in Scotland
Stirling City Choir
List of town defences in Scotland

References

External links

Stirling Council Website
Mapping the Town: the history of Stirling, presented by Julian Richards (BBC Radio 4) (RealAudio format)
Video footage of St Ninian's Chapel and Well
series of lectures about the history of Stirling by Dr Murray Cook, Stirling Council's archaeologist

 
County towns in Scotland
Cities in Scotland
Royal burghs
Large burghs
Ports and harbours of Scotland
Highland Boundary Fault